The 1844 United States presidential election in Alabama took place between November 1 and December 4, 1844, as part of the 1844 United States presidential election. Voters chose nine representatives, or electors to the Electoral College, who voted for President and Vice President.

Alabama voted for the Democratic candidate, James K. Polk, over Whig candidate Henry Clay. Polk won Alabama by a margin of 17.98%.

Results

See also
United States presidential elections in Alabama

References

Alabama
1844
1844 Alabama elections